Paul Wood is a New Zealand motivational speaker, author, facilitator, and doctor of psychology.

Biography
Wood left high school early, associating with a peer group which valued drugs and violence. Wood was dependent on drugs, committing crimes to maintain his habit. At 18 years old, Wood went to prison in Paremoremo Prison for murdering his 42 year old drug dealer, Boyd Bevan, after he attempted to sexually assault Wood. Wood was convicted of murder and served 11 years in prison. Wood's mother passed away three days before the murder.  He served part of his sentence in Paremoremo Prison, which he described as "New Zealand’s toughest facility."

From prison, he started a PhD in psychology. Wood completed his undergraduate and master's degrees while imprisoned, and he commenced a PhD. He is the first New Zealander to have achieved both feats. More than 10 years after his release, the Parole Board granted Wood a rare discharge.

Wood has written a bestselling book How to Escape from Prison, an autobiography on his life, and Mental Fitness, a self-help book on building resilience. He also spoke at TEDxAuckland and other conferences.

Personal life and views
Wood is married with children.

Work

Books

Speech

References

Living people
21st-century New Zealand writers
New Zealand motivational speakers
New Zealand bloggers
Mental health activists
New Zealand people convicted of murder
Year of birth missing (living people)